Time Machine is a video compilation by the American heavy metal band Dio. Ronnie James Dio made extra narration to every song in this video.

Reception

"If you're a Dio Fan, you'll enjoy the videos as it's definitely a good span of the band's music through the years," wrote Matt Beaman in the Black Sabbath fanzine Southern Cross. "If you're not, then you'll probably end up moaning about 'that bloody dragon'!"

Tracks
 "Wild One" (Ronnie James Dio, Rowan Robertson)
 "Holy Diver" (Dio)
 "Rainbow in the Dark" (Vinny Appice, Jimmy Bain, Vivian Campbell, Dio)
 "The Last in Line" (Bain, Campbell, Dio)
 "Hungry for Heaven" (Bain, Dio)
 "Rock 'n' Roll Children" (Dio)
 "Stand Up and Shout" (Bain, Dio)
 "King of Rock and Roll" (Appice, Bain, Campbell, Dio)
 "All the Fools Sailed Away" (Dio, Craig Goldy)

References

Heavy metal video albums
1991 video albums
Reprise Records video albums
PolyGram video albums
Dio (band) video albums